Murexsul profundus is a species of sea snail, a marine gastropod mollusk in the family Muricidae, the murex snails or rock snails.

Description

Distribution
This marine species is endemic to New Zealand.

References

External links
 Marshall, B. A.; Burch, K. W. (2000). The New Zealand Recent species of Muricopsis Bucquoy, Dautzenberg & Dollfus, 1882 (Gastropoda: Muricidae). The Nautilus. 114: 18-29

Muricidae
Gastropods described in 2000